Daniel B. Elliott is an American attorney and politician serving as a member of the Kentucky House of Representatives from the 54th district. He assumed office on March 15, 2016.

Early life and education 
Elliott was born in Danville, Kentucky and attended Boyle County High School. He earned a Bachelor of Arts degree in political science from Bellarmine University and a Juris Doctor from the University of Louisville School of Law.

Career 
During college, Elliott interned in the office of Senator Jim Bunning. Since graduating from law school, he has worked as an attorney. He has also served as a member of the Perryville Battlefield Commission, Lake Cumberland Area Development Board of Directors, and Council of State Governments Intergovernmental Affairs Commission. He was elected to the Kentucky House of Representatives in March 2016, and currently serves as chair of the House Judiciary Committee. Elliott also served as vice chair of the House Economic Development & Workforce Investment Committee.

References 

Living people
Kentucky lawyers
Republican Party members of the Kentucky House of Representatives
People from Boyle County, Kentucky
People from Danville, Kentucky
Bellarmine University alumni
University of Louisville School of Law alumni
Year of birth missing (living people)